The ArmaLite AR-30 is a bolt-action rifle manufactured by Armalite. Based in part on Armalite's AR-50 rifle, the AR-30 is available in three cartridges; the .308 Winchester, .300 Winchester Magnum and .338 Lapua. It was introduced at the 2000 SHOT Show.

Design 
The AR-30 features a 5-round detachable box magazine. The weight is 12 pounds empty. It includes a 26-inch chrome-moly barrel, 6-groove, RH 1:10-inch twist, and 48 inches overall length. The receiver is modified in octagonal form, drilled, and slotted for a scope rail. The bolt is a dual front locking lug. There is a Shilen standard single-stage trigger with approximately 5 lb. pull. A muzzle brake is optional on the .308 Win. and .300 Win. Mag models; it is standard on the .338 Lapua model. The scope rail is mil-standard with boss to engage cross-slot on the receiver. Stock comes in 3 sections, extruded forend, machine grip frame with vertical grip, forged, and machined removable buttstock. The buttplate is vertically adjustable, specifically-built for heavy calibers.

Variants

AR-30A1
In November 2012, Armalite announced the introduction of the AR-30A1.  The AR-30A1 is completely redesigned and shares few parts in common with the original AR-30.  The new A1 model is available in two calibers: .300 Winchester Magnum and .338 Lapua Magnum. Both chamberings are available in a "standard", fixed stock version and a "target" version with a thumb-wheel adjustable stock and enhanced sight and accessory rails. The AR-30A1 replaces the AR-30 in the Armalite product lineup.

AR-31
ArmaLite announced the introduction of the AR-31 at the National Association of Sporting Goods Wholesalers Expo in October 2013. The AR-31 is a short-action rifle based on the long-action AR-30A1. The initial rifle offered was chambered in .308 Win, and the rifle will accept AR-10B magazines.

See also 
List of ArmaLite rifles
 Armalite AR-50, .50 caliber rifle

References

External links
 Armalite AR-30 Owners Manual
 Armalite AR-30A1 Owners Manual
 ArmaLite AR30 Bolt-Action Rifle @shootingtimes.com
 Official Page

7.62×51mm NATO rifles
.338 Lapua Magnum rifles
Bolt-action rifles of the United States